Peter Brinckerhoff, also stylized as Peter Brinkerhoff, is an American television director who  primarily directed soap operas. Brinckerhoff received six Daytime Emmy Award nominations and won once in 1991 for co-directing Santa Barbara. His other notable credits include Sunset Beach, Spyder Games, Passions, General Hospital, and The Young and the Restless.

Positions held

Another World
 Director (1989)

As the World Turns
 Director (1983)

Capitol
 Director (1984)

Passions
 Director (entire run, 1999–2008)

Santa Barbara
 Director (1991–1993)

Search for Tomorrow
 Stage Manager (1980)

Spyder Games
 Director (entire run, 2001)

Sunset Beach
 Director (entire run, 1997–1999)

General Hospital
 Director (1993–2009)

General Hospital: Night Shift
Director (all eps of season two)

Days of Our Lives
Director (December 23, 2008–present)

The Young and the Restless
 Director (May 5, 2009–present)

Awards and nominations
Daytime Emmy Award
Nomination, 2004, Directing, Passions
Nomination, 2003, Directing, Passions
Nomination, 2002, Special Class Directing, Spyder Games
Nomination, 2001, Directing, Passions
Nomination, 2000, Directing, Sunset Beach
Win, 1991, Directing, Santa Barbara

References

External links

American television directors
Year of birth missing (living people)
Living people